Michael Kelleher is an American poet. He is the author of four collections of poems, Visible Instruments (Chax Press, 2017), Museum Hours (BlazeVOX Books, 2016) Human Scale (BlazeVOX Books, 2007) and To Be Sung (BlazeVOX Books, 2005). His poems and essays have appeared at The Brooklyn Rail, Sentence: A Journal of Prose Poetics, The Colorado Review, ecopoetics, and many others. He has read his work throughout the U.S., in Canada, the U.K., and Africa, and also as part of the Encuentro del Poesia Del Lenguaje in Havana, Cuba, in 2001. With Ammiel Alcalay, he founded OlsonNow, a project devoted to the poetry and poetics of Charles Olson. From 2008-2013, he produced a blog project called "Aimless Reading", in which he daily photographed, catalogued, and wrote about the more than 1200 titles in his personal library. He is the former Artistic Director of Just Buffalo Literary Center, where in 2007 he founded Babel, an international author lecture series, at which he conducted live, on-stage interviews with authors such as Orhan Pamuk, V.S. Naipaul, and Salman Rushdie. In 2012, he was appointed the founding Director of the Windham-Campbell Literature Prizes at Yale University.

External links
 Pearlblossom Highway Kelleher's personal blog and the home of the Aimless Reading Project
 OlsonNow a blog on the poetry and poetics of Charles Olson, edited by Michael Kelleher and Ammiel Alcalay
Feature: Robert Creeley (1926–2005) edited by Michael Kelleher, with contributions by Amiri Baraka & Susan Howe among others

American male poets
Living people
Year of birth missing (living people)